The Silent is an epithet applied to:

John the Silent (452–558), Christian saint
Secundus the Silent, second century Cynic or Neopythagorean philosopher
William the Silent (1533–1584), Prince of Orange, main leader of the Dutch revolt against the Spanish

Lists of people by epithet